Conor Michael John Lawless (born 16 May 2001) is an English professional footballer who plays as a midfielder for Farnborough on loan from  side Luton Town.

Career
Having come through Reading's academy, Lawless signed his first professional contract with the club in September 2018, and signed a contract extension in January 2020. He made his senior debut as a substitute in a 1–0 FA Cup defeat away to Luton Town on 9 January 2021. Lawless was released by the club in summer 2021 following the expiry of his contract.

On 21 September 2021, Luton Town announced the signing of Lawless. 

On 17 February 2023, Lawless signed for National League South club Farnborough on a one-month loan deal.

Career statistics

References

2001 births
Living people
English footballers
Association football midfielders
Reading F.C. players
Luton Town F.C. players
Farnborough F.C. players